Nguyễn Sinh Sắc (1862–1929) was the father of Ho Chi Minh.

His wife and The mother of Ho Chi Minh, was Hoàng Thị Loan (1868–1901), the daughter of his adoptive father and teacher. He passed the Confucian cử nhân examination in 1894 and in 1901 gained a second-rank (pho bang) position. He was a magistrate in the Binh Khe district (Qui Nhơn), until he was demoted for abuse of power after a landlord whom he had ordered to be beaten died shortly after receiving a caning. Ho Chi Minh's parents' house is now preserved as the Kim Liên museum.

References

Vietnamese government officials
1862 births
1929 deaths
Ho Chi Minh
People from Nghệ An province